Crossroads Church may refer to:

Crossroads (Cincinnati), Ohio
Crossroads Christian Church, California
Cross Roads Church, Maryland
Church of the Crossroads, Hawaii
Crossroads Community Cathedral, Connecticut